The Men with Blue Dots (mon. Хөх толбот хүмүүс, latin script "Hoh Tolbot Humuus") is a Mongolian 2011 movie drama directed by Dorjsuren Shadav.

Plot 
The film tells the story of a young man who has decided to go abroad to France. There he survived the cultural shock and collided with the reality, because he had never left his native village in Mongolia.

Cast 
 T. Erdenebayar as Gunbold
 P. Battor as Jaamaa
 A. Mungunzul as Ankhmaa
 C. Tumurbaatar as Ganbaa
 Sunam Uudam as Ganbaa baga nas

References

External links 
 Official website DOZ Entertainment
 The Men with Blue Dots at the Internet Movie Database
 

2011 films
Mongolian drama films